Ardraly is a townland located in the barony of West Carbery, in County Cork, Ireland.
Archival records of 1601 list Ardrawly from the Calendar to Fiants of reign of Henry VIII.

Historical sites include a church, country house, earthwork and a souterrain. The church site is labeled as Kilnamorahaun on 19th century maps.

See also
 List of townlands of the barony of West Carbery (East Division)

References 

Townlands of County Cork